Phasianotrochus apicinus, common name the pointed kelp shell, is a species of sea snail, a marine gastropod mollusk in the family Trochidae, the top snails.

Description
The height of the shell attains 20 mm. The  imperforate, solid, smooth shell has an elongated conical shape. It is shining, grayish, or brownish-yellow, with numerous narrow, fine, crowded, obliquely longitudinal red lines. These are often hard to perceive on account of the golden and violet iridescence. The whole surface is microscopically spirally striate. The striae are coarser on the base. The 8 to 9 whorls are nearly flat. The upper whorls are pink. The acute spire is turreted, and straight sided. The sutures are linear, sometimes with a white margin. The body whorl is rounded at the periphery. The oval aperture is slightly exceeding one-third the total length of the shell. It is smooth and not sulcate. It is beautifully iridescent within. The columella has a subacute tooth below the middle.

Distribution
This marine species is endemic to Australia and occurs in the shallow subtidal zones off Victoria, Southern Australia, Western Australia and the north coast of Tasmania

References

Menke, C.T. 1843. Molluscorum Novae Hollandiae Specimen in Libraria Aulica Hahniana. Hannover : Hahniana 46 pp
Philippi, R.A. 1850. Trochidae. pp. 121–136 in Küster, H.C. (ed). Systematisches Conchylien-Cabinet von Martini und Chemnitz. Nürnberg : Bauer & Raspe Vol. II.
Angas, G.F. 1867. A list of species of marine Mollusca found in Port Jackson harbour, New South Wales and on the adjacent coasts, with notes on their habits etc. Proceedings of the Zoological Society of London 1867: 185-233, 912-935
Tenison-Woods, J.E. 1876. Description of new Tasmanian shells. Papers and Proceedings of the Royal Society of Tasmania 1875: 134-162
Allan, J.K. 1950. Australian Shells: with related animals living in the sea, in freshwater and on the land. Melbourne : Georgian House xix, 470 pp., 45 pls, 112 text figs.
Cotton, B.C. 1959. South Australian Mollusca. Archaeogastropoda. Handbook of the Flora and Fauna of South Australia. Adelaide : South Australian Government Printer 449 pp
Ludbrook, N.H. 1978. Quaternary molluscs of the western part of the Eucla Basin. Bulletin of the Geological Survey of Western Australia 125: 1-286 92, pl. 20, figs 5, 11
Wilson, B. 1993. Australian Marine Shells. Prosobranch Gastropods. Kallaroo, Western Australia : Odyssey Publishing Vol. 1

External links
To World Register of Marine Species

apicinus
Gastropods of Australia
Gastropods described in 1843